Christine Præsttun (1971 – 8 January 2020) was a Norwegian television presenter and correspondent.

She studied sociology at the University of Oslo, graduating in 2001 with a master's thesis about identity and modernity in Hong Kong. While studying she had become involved in RadiOrakel in 1993, and while doing field work in Hong Kong in 1996 she managed to become P4 Radio's correspondent.

After graduation she was hired in the Norwegian Broadcasting Corporation and from 2002 to 2005 she was the inaugural presenter of the debate show Standpunkt. She later presented the radio programmes Dagsnytt 18, Ukeslutt and Søndagsavisa. Together with her husband Sverre Tom Radøy she was the Norwegian Broadcasting Corporation correspondent in Africa, stationed in Kenya, from 2014 to 2018.

She resided at Nesøya. She died from cancer in January 2020, only 48 years old.

References

1971 births
2020 deaths
University of Oslo alumni

NRK people
Norwegian television reporters and correspondents
Norwegian radio presenters
Norwegian women radio presenters
Norwegian expatriates in Kenya
Deaths from cancer in Norway